The Rider of the King Log is a lost 1921 American silent action film directed by Harry O. Hoyt and starring Frank Sheridan, Irene Boyle, and Richard Travers.

Cast
 Frank Sheridan as John Xavier Kavanagh 
 Irene Boyle as Clare Kavanagh 
 Richard Travers as Kenneth Marthorn 
 Emily Chichester as Cora Marthorn 
 Arthur Donaldson as Stephen Marthorn 
 Charles Slattery as Tim Mulkern 
 Carlton Brickert as Donald Kezar 
 John Woodford as Abner Kezar 
 William Black as Warren Britt 
 Albert Roccardi as Father Laflamme
 Bananas as the Black Bear

References

Bibliography
Goble, Alan. The Complete Index to Literary Sources in Film. Walter de Gruyter, 1999.

External links

1921 films
1920s action films
American action films
Films directed by Harry O. Hoyt
American silent feature films
Pathé Exchange films
Associated Exhibitors films
American black-and-white films
Lost American films
1921 lost films
Lost action films
1920s English-language films
1920s American films